A monitor is a class of relatively small warship that is lightly armoured, often provided with disproportionately large guns, and originally designed for coastal warfare. The term "monitor" grew to include breastwork monitors, the largest class of riverine warcraft known as river monitors, and was sometimes used as a generic term for any turreted ship. In the early 20th century, the term "monitor" included shallow-draft armoured shore bombardment vessels, particularly those of the Royal Navy: the s carried guns that fired the heaviest shells ever used at sea and saw action against German targets during World War I. Two small Royal Navy monitors from the First World War,  and  survived to fight in the Second World War. When the requirement for shore support and strong shallow-water coastal defence returned, new monitors and variants such as coastal defence ships were built (e.g. the British s). Allied monitors saw service in the Mediterranean in support of the British Eighth Army's desert and Italian campaigns. They were part of the offshore bombardment for the Invasion of Normandy in 1944. They were also used to clear the German-mined River Scheldt by the British to utilize the port of Antwerp. The German, Yugoslav, Croatian, Romanian, Hungarian and Czech armed forces operated river monitors that saw combat during World War II.

The List of ships of the Second World War contains major military vessels of the war, arranged alphabetically and by type. The list includes armed vessels that served during the war and in the immediate aftermath, inclusive of localized ongoing combat operations, garrison surrenders, post-surrender occupation, colony re-occupation, troop and prisoner repatriation, to the end of 1945. For smaller vessels, see also list of World War II ships of less than 1000 tons. Some uncompleted Axis ships are included, out of historic interest. Ships are designated to the country under which they operated for the longest period of the Second World War, regardless of where they were built or previous service history.

References

Bibliography 

 

 
Monitors